Hydrolagus is a genus of fish in the family Chimaeridae found in the Atlantic, Indian and Pacific Oceans.

Species
The 22 recognized species in this genus are:
 Hydrolagus affinis (Brito Capello (pt), 1868) (small-eyed rabbitfish)
 Hydrolagus africanus (Gilchrist, 1922) (African chimaera) 
 Hydrolagus alberti Bigelow & Schroeder, 1951 (gulf chimaera)
 Hydrolagus alphus Quaranta, Didier, Long & Ebert, 2006 (whitespot ghost shark)
 Hydrolagus barbouri (Garman, 1908)  (ninespot chimaera)
 Hydrolagus bemisi Didier, 2002 (pale ghostshark)
 Hydrolagus colliei (G. T. Lay & E. T. Bennett, 1839) (spotted ratfish)
 Hydrolagus eidolon D. S. Jordan & C. L. Hubbs, 1925
 Hydrolagus erithacus Walovich, Ebert & Kemper, 2017 (Robin's ghostshark) 
 Hydrolagus homonycteris Didier, 2008 (black ghostshark)
 Hydrolagus lusitanicus T. Moura, I. M. R. Figueiredo, Bordalo-Machado, A. C. Almeida & Serrano-Gordo, 2005 (Portuguese chimaera)
 Hydrolagus macrophthalmus F. de Buen, 1959 (bigeye chimaera)
 Hydrolagus marmoratus Didier, 2008 (marbled ghost shark)
 Hydrolagus matallanasi Soto & Vooren, 2004 (striped rabbitfish)
 Hydrolagus mccoskeri L. A. K. Barnett, Didier, Long & Ebert, 2006 (Galápagos ghostshark)
 Hydrolagus melanophasma K. C. James, Ebert, Long & Didier, 2009 (Eastern Pacific black ghostshark)
 Hydrolagus mirabilis (Collett, 1904) (large-eyed rabbitfish)
 Hydrolagus mitsukurii (D. S. Jordan & Snyder, 1904) (Mitsukuri's chimaera)
 Hydrolagus novaezealandiae (Fowler, 1911) (dark ghostshark)
 Hydrolagus pallidus Hardy & Stehmann, 1990 (pale chimaera)
 Hydrolagus purpurescens (C. H. Gilbert, 1905) (purple chimaera)
 Hydrolagus trolli Didier & Séret (fr), 2002 (abyssal ghostshark)
Fossil remains of the genus are known from the Miocene and Pliocene of California.

References

 
Cartilaginous fish genera
Marine fish genera
Taxa named by Theodore Gill
Taxonomy articles created by Polbot